Ŭnp'a County is a county in North Hwanghae province, North Korea.

Administrative divisions
Ŭnp'a county is divided into 1 ŭp (town), 1 rodongjagu (workers' districts) and 15 ri (villages):

Transportation
Ŭnp'a county is served by the Hwanghae Ch'ŏngnyŏn and Ŭllyul lines of the Korean State Railway.

References

Counties of North Hwanghae